Victoria Junior College (VJC), often known as Victoria, is a co-educational junior college in Singapore offering pre-university education to boarding and day-students. Founded in 1984, the school stands on Marine Vista, less than one kilometre from the affiliated Victoria School.

VJC is part of the Victoria-Cedar alliance, and is one of Singapore's top Junior Colleges. The school's programmes and activities are advised by the Victoria Advisory Committee, while day-to-day operations of the school is run by the School Principal. Tutors and faculty members are responsible for the governance of student-life.

History
Victoria Junior College was established in 1984 to replace the Pre-University classes in Victoria School (VS). The pioneer batch of 776 students was received with 51 teachers and 16 supporting staff. The outstanding results of the pioneer batch of students in the GCE 'A' Level examinations was to set the academic standard for succeeding generations of Victorians.

Over the years, VJC has widely been recognised, based on MOE rankings and entry scores, as one of the top three junior colleges in Singapore that offer the 'A' Levels. VJC was also ranked the top junior college in the Ministry of Education's (MOE) ST ranking of junior colleges in 1995 and 2001, based on academic results. More recently in 2019, it had the 4th toughest entry score amongst junior colleges offering the 'A' Levels.

In 1989, VJC was the first and, until 2005, the only junior college in Singapore to offer Theatre Studies and Drama as an 'A' Level subject. It also offered a university-level French curriculum as part of the Language Elective Programme until it was discontinued in 2006.

Since 2005, VJC has offered the Integrated Programme, allowing students from the affiliated Victoria School to skip O Levels and proceed to junior college. The Victoria Integrated Programme (VIP) was implemented as a four-year programme starting from Secondary 3. In 2012 it was replaced by the six-year Victoria-Cedar Alliance Integrated Programme (VCA IP), in partnership with Cedar Girls' Secondary School.

VJC was awarded the School Excellence Award in 2007, the top award in the MOE Masterplan of Awards framework.

Principal
The college saw its first leadership change in 2001, when founding principal, Lee Phui Mun, stepped down after 18 years of service. She was succeeded by Low Khah Gek, who was a former chemistry teacher in the school. In 2006, Chan Poh Meng, formerly a Superintendent at the Schools Division, took over the reins from Low. In December 2013, Ek Soo Ben, Deputy Director at the Standards and Research Academy of Singapore Teachers and a former Economics teacher at VJC, succeeded Chan.

Academics  
Victoria Junior College's two-year curriculum culminates in the Singapore GCE Advanced Level examinations. Students take up to four Higher 2 subjects and read two compulsory Higher 1 subjects - General Paper and Project Work - in their first year, and may elect to read additional Higher 3 subjects in the second year. Approximately 30% of students read Higher 1 Mother Tongue Language in their first year too.  Home to the East Zone Science and Technology Centre, the college also sent the first Singapore school team to participate in the International Science and Engineering Fair in 2004.

VJC is one of the three schools in Singapore that holds the BioMedical Admissions Test (BMAT).

Achievements

Sports 
In 2017, VJC won the A-division championship title for girls' football, boys' floorball, boys' wushu and hockey girls. This was the fifth straight title for the girls' football team, and their ninth in the last ten years.

In 2018, VJC won the A-division championship title for both the boys' and girls' football, hockey girls and wushu boys. This is VJC's 16th consecutive year winning the A-division girls' hockey.

In 2019, VJC won the A-division championship title for girls' football, girls' floorball, girls' wushu and girls' rockclimbing.

Performing Arts

Choir 
The VJC Choir was the first school choir from Singapore to win an international choir competition. It beat 30 top choirs from other parts of the world in the 800-year-old Cardigan Eisteddfod Competition in Wales in 1990, and for its outstanding contribution to music in Singapore, the VJC Choir was presented with the 1990 Guinness Stout Effort Award.

In 2004, Victoria Junior College Choir represented Singapore in the World Choir Games held in Bremen, Germany and won Gold Medals in all three contested categories, namely Musica Sacra, Contemporary Music and Open Mixed. It emerged as the Olympic Champion of the Open Mixed Category, and second placing in the Musica Sacra and Contemporary Music categories.

In 2006, VJC choir won the esteemed Audience Prize and Grand Prix Award in the 9th Concorso Corale Internazionale (International Choir Competition) held in Riva Del Garda, Italy. The VJC Choir won Gold for both the categories they competed in - Musica Sacra and Mixed Youth, and emerged as Category Winner for the latter. It is the first time an Asian Choir has won the grand prize and one of a few choirs in the world to win both the Audience Prize and Grand Prix Award together.

In 2018, VJC choir competed in the Asia Cantate and clinched the Grand Prize. In addition, they also won two other categories—the Mixed Voices Choir (Open) and the Mixed Voices Choir (Senior Youth).

As of December 2021, it was ranked 5th in the world in the mixed choirs category of the INTERKULTUR World Rankings.

Dance 
VJC Dance Ensemble achieved overall grand champion in the 2010 Lecco Danza, an international dance competition held in Italy. They were awarded first prize in the contemporary senior dance group category and first runners-up in the hip-hop group category.

In 2012, VJC dancers were champions in the Jazz Dance Small Group category at the 9th World Dance Olympiad in Moscow, Russia.

In the 2014 Crown International Dance Festival in Melbourne, Australia, the dance ensemble placed first in all the three categories that it participated in, namely Contemporary, Modern Expression and Hip Hop.

Affiliations
VJC is affiliated to Victoria School, an all-boys school founded in 1876.

VJC provided VS students an option to continue a two-year junior college education within the Victorian family after the completion of their secondary education. VS students choosing to enter VJC get two bonus points off their GCE 'O'-Level L1R5 academic aggregate.

Since the 2012 school year, VS and Cedar Girls' Secondary School have offered the Victoria-Cedar Alliance Integrated Programme (VCA IP) option. After finishing Secondary 4, 160 students from each school continue on to VJC automatically.

Alumni 
The alumni body, Old Victorians' Association (OVA), was established in 1941. It serves as a channel for former students of Victoria School and Victoria Junior College to continue to associate with their alma mater.

The OVA supports the activities undertaken by the schools, assists needy students, and promotes sports, social and cultural activities among members.

In 2009, OVA organised the inaugural combined VS and VJC gala concert, with a 260-strong cast comprising both students and celebrity alumni, at the Esplanade Concert Hall.

In 2011, OVA organised the Victoria School 135th Anniversary Celebration Dinner at the former VS campus at Tyrwhitt Road.

Notable alumni

Politics and Government
 Lawrence Wong: Deputy Prime Minister (2022–present), Minister for Finance (2021–present) and Member of Parliament (2011–present)
 Gan Siow Huang: Minister of State for Education, Minister of State for Manpower and Member of Parliament (2020–present); First female general of the Singapore Armed Forces
 Chong Chieng Jen: Deputy Minister of Domestic Trade and Consumer Affairs, Malaysia (2018–2020)
 Alex Yam: Member of Parliament (2011–present)
 Henry Kwek: Member of Parliament (2015–present)
 Nadia Ahmad Samdin: Member of Parliament (2020–present)
 Janice Koh: Nominated Member of Parliament (2012–2014)
 Douglas Foo: Nominated Member of Parliament (2018–2020)
 Nicole Seah: Politician

Arts
Maddy Barber: Radio presenter
Boon Hui Lu: Singer-songwriter and actress
Felicia Chin: Actress
Michelle Chong: Film producer, director and actress
Joanna Dong: Jazz singer and actress
Natalie Hennedige, playwright
Ho Yeow Sun (Sun Ho): Singer and actress
Lee Teng: Actor and presenter
Sonny Liew: Comic artist/illustrator;
Rebecca Lim: Actress
Ling Kai: Singer-songwriter
Nuraliza Osman: Lawyer and beauty queen
Joanne Peh: Actress
ShiLi & Adi: Musicians
J C Sum: Illusionist
Kirsten Tan: Film director and screenwriter
Tan Pin Pin: Film director 
Kelvin Tong: Film director, producer and screenwriter

Sports
 Koh Seng Leong: Olympian (Sailing), 2000 Summer Olympics and 2008 Summer Olympics
 Deborah Ong: Olympian (Sailing), 2008 Summer Olympics
 Elizabeth Yin: Olympian (Sailing), 2012 Summer Olympics
 Denise Lim: Olympian (Sailing), 2016 Summer Olympics
 Sara Tan: Olympian (Sailing), 2016 Summer Olympics
 Gavin Lee (football coach): Football coach; Youngest football coach in the Singapore Premier League
 Anders Aplin: First Singaporean footballer to play in the J2 League and in Japan.
 Mah Li Lian: Winner, Asian Individual Squash Championships, 1988, 1990, 1992 and 1994; Sportsgirl of the Year, 1987; Sportswoman of the Year, 1989 and 1991

Others
 Adam Khoo: Entrepreneur, author and trainer
Willin Low: Chef

External links 

Official website of Victoria Junior College

References

Junior colleges in Singapore
Schools offering Integrated Programme in Singapore
Victoria schools, Singapore
 
People associated with Victoria schools, Singapore
Educational institutions established in 1984
Marine Parade
1984 establishments in Singapore